Héctor Demarco (31 May 1936 – 21 June 2010) was a Uruguayan footballer. He played in 14 matches for the Uruguay national football team from 1955 to 1959. He was also part of Uruguay's squad for the 1956 South American Championship.

References

External links
 
 Profile at ASOCIACIÓN URUGUAYA DE FÚTBOL

1936 births
2010 deaths
Uruguayan footballers
Uruguay international footballers
Place of birth missing
Association football forwards
Defensor Sporting players
Bologna F.C. 1909 players
L.R. Vicenza players
Uruguayan expatriate footballers
Expatriate footballers in Italy